Cora Helena Etter (née Brown; October 10, 1924  – August 19, 2020) was a Canadian politician in Nova Scotia.

She served in the 54th General Assembly of Nova Scotia as a Progressive Conservative member for Hants East. In the 1988 election, she was defeated by Liberal Jack Hawkins.

Prior to entering provincial politics, she served on the council of the Municipality of East Hants.

Etter died in August 2020 at the age of 95.

References

1924 births
2020 deaths
People from Hants County, Nova Scotia
Progressive Conservative Association of Nova Scotia MLAs
Women MLAs in Nova Scotia